Platyoplus is a genus of shield-backed katydids in the family Tettigoniidae. There is one described species in Platyoplus, P. gilaensis.

References

Further reading

 

Tettigoniinae
Articles created by Qbugbot
Monotypic Orthoptera genera